Ryan MacDonald (born May 25, 1977, in Kansas City, Missouri) is an American writer, sound and visual artist.  He won the American Short(er) Fiction Award for his title story in 2012.

Education
MacDonald earned a BFA from the Kansas City Art Institute, a Master of Fine Arts degree in Studio Art and a Master of Fine Arts in English from the University of Massachusetts, Amherst (where he was a University Fellow).

Career
He is the author of The Observable Characteristics of Organisms (2014) from Fiction Collective 2. In 2012, he won the American Short(er) Fiction Award for his title story. In 2017 he was nominated for a Bessie Award in Outstanding Composition and Sound Design for Choreographer Vanessa Anspaugh's, The End of Men, Again.

Bibliography 
 The Observable Characteristics of Organisms. FC2 2014.

References 

21st-century American writers
Living people
1977 births
Writers from Kansas City, Missouri
Kansas City Art Institute alumni
University of Massachusetts Amherst alumni